It's Always Sunny in Philadelphia is an American sitcom created by Rob McElhenney and developed by McElhenney and Glenn Howerton that premiered on August 4, 2005, on FX and later FXX beginning with the ninth season in 2013. It stars Charlie Day, Howerton, McElhenney, Kaitlin Olson and Danny DeVito. The series follows the exploits of "The Gang", a group of narcissistic, sociopathic friends who run the Irish dive bar Paddy's Pub in South Philadelphia, Pennsylvania, but spend most of their free time drinking, scheming, arguing amongst themselves, and plotting elaborate cons against others, and at times each other, for personal benefit, financial gain, revenge, or simply out of boredom, while belittling, berating, and manipulating each other in the process at seemingly any opportunity.

The 14th season concluded in November 2019, and was renewed for a 15th season in May 2020, which premiered on December 1, 2021. This resulted in it having more seasons than any other American live-action comedy series, replacing The Adventures of Ozzie and Harriet, which ran for 14 seasons (435 episodes) between 1952 and 1966. In December 2020, the series was renewed for a total of four additional seasons, bringing it to 18 seasons.

The show has received critical acclaim, with many lauding the cast performances and dark humor. It has amassed a large cult following.

Plot

Premise 
The series follows a group of misfit, narcissistic sociopaths, referred to as "The Gang", who run a meager, unsuccessful Irish bar called Paddy's Pub in the neighborhood of South Philadelphia. The Gang originally consists of janitor Charlie Kelly (Charlie Day), bouncer Mac (Rob McElhenney), and bartender Dennis Reynolds (Glenn Howerton), the three of whom also own Paddy's Pub, in addition to Dennis' twin sister Dee Reynolds (Kaitlin Olson), a struggling actress who works as a waitress there. In season 2, they are joined by Frank Reynolds (Danny DeVito), an eccentric millionaire and the neglectful father of the Reynolds twins, who takes over most of the ownership of the bar. He soon becomes the financial catalyst for the Gang, often funding many of the Gang's over-complicated plots, while simultaneously succumbing to the brazen depravity of the group.

Each member of The Gang exhibits unethical behavior and anti-social traits such as extreme selfishness, pathological dishonesty, narcissism, aggression, excessive drinking and substance abuse, unregulated emotions, cruelty, and absolutely no regard for the people around them, while also displaying acute codependency, stupidity, and a surprising lack of awareness of basic social norms. The comedy of the show emerges from these extreme character traits resulting in conflicts that lead The Gang into absurd, dark and painfully embarrassing situations, typically ending with them getting their comeuppance, but never learning their lesson. This allows the show to mine a variety of socio-political and economic issues for satire and dark humor, while keeping the characters in a state of relative stasis conducive to the long-running sitcom format.

Episodes usually find The Gang hatching elaborate schemes and regularly conspiring, against both outsiders and one another, for personal gain, revenge, or simply schadenfreude. They habitually inflict physical and psychological pain on anyone who crosses their path, even each other, yet always return to the status quo at Paddy's Pub because they have alienated the rest of society and have only each other's company in the end. The Gang has no sense of shame when attempting to get what they want and often engage in activities that others would find humiliating, disgusting, or shocking. Some of these situations include pretending to be disabled and becoming addicted to crack cocaine in order to qualify for welfare, attempted cannibalism, kidnapping, waterboarding, blackface, blackmail, stalking, grave robbing, hiding naked inside a couch to eavesdrop on people, tricking a man into giving his daughter a lap dance, foraging naked in the sewers for rings and coins; impersonating police officers to extort civilians; creating a cult; secretly feeding someone their dead pet; plugging their open wounds with trash; setting an apartment full of people on fire and nailing the exit shut; taking out life insurance on a suicidal person; and lying about having AIDS in order to get priority access to water park rides. In an angry summation of their circumstances during one such escapade, Dennis laments The Gang's dynamic:

With rare exceptions, Paddy's Pub generates limited revenue. Most stay away from the establishment due to the numerous stabbings that have taken place. The few regular customers have been known to serve themselves. The Gang has been known to close Paddy's for extended periods without warning. When the bar is open, they shirk their respective jobs' responsibilities and choose to drink instead. Paddy's is only able to stay in business because of Frank's financial backing, government bailouts and tax fraud.

Cast and characters
The show features a core cast of five characters (The Gang) and a recurring cast of colorful side characters, including the Waitress, Cricket, the McPoyles, the Ponderosas, the Lawyer and various family members like Mrs Kelly, Mrs Mac and Uncle Jack Kelly, who cross paths and interact with the Gang in increasingly unhinged ways as the show progresses.

Main 

 Charlie Day as Charlie Kelly, co-owner and janitor of Paddy's Pub. He is a childhood friend of Mac, and high school friend of Dennis and Dee. He lives in squalor with Frank in a run-down, vermin-infested apartment, and has deep-seated psychological problems, partly due to substance abuse from huffing paint and glue, and partly due to his complicated family background possibly involving child abuse. He has an extensive history of pica and regularly eats various items not meant for human consumption, such as cat food, stickers, paint, and bleach. Due to his general lack of intelligence and his illiteracy, he is arguably the simplest member of The Gang. Despite this, Charlie is a naturally gifted musician, a self-proclaimed expert in "bird law" and possibly the only competent worker at Paddy's with his knack for unorthodox maintenance practices ("Charlie Work"). He also has an unhealthy obsession with "The Waitress", a recurring character who finds his interest in her creepy.
 Glenn Howerton as Dennis Reynolds, co-owner and the main bartender of Paddy's Pub, in addition to being Dee's twin brother and Frank's son. Originally the most intelligent and normal-seeming of the three co-owners, Dennis is slowly revealed to be the most narcissistic and psychopathic of The Gang. Dennis is extremely superficial, selfish, vain and abrasive. His predatory nature is often depicted through numerous attempts to seduce various women; which, when successful, result in him gaslighting and emotionally abusing them in order to win over their favor before inevitably dumping them once he has had sex with them ("The D.E.N.N.I.S. System"). It is strongly hinted at times that Dennis may secretly be a serial killer, though this remains ambiguous as a running gag. In season 10, he is diagnosed with borderline personality disorder, though he frequently denies this and believes himself to be completely rational, and is convinced that he is in complete control of everything and everyone around him, going as far as to label himself a 'golden god'. In the season 12 finale, Dennis reveals to the rest of the gang that he has an infant son, and moves to North Dakota to raise him. He returns to Philadelphia in season 13, supposedly supporting his family from a distance.
 Rob McElhenney as Ronald "Mac" McDonald, co-owner and self-proclaimed bouncer of Paddy's Pub. He is Charlie's childhood friend and Dennis's high school friend. The son of a convicted felon who has been in prison for much of Mac's life, he frequently attempts to demonstrate his toughness and refers to himself as the "sheriff of Paddy's". Deeply insecure, Mac constantly seeks the approval of those around him, especially his father, his apathetic and emotionally absent mother, and Dennis, his roommate. He suffers from extreme bouts of body dysmorphia, and has been depicted at various weights throughout the course of the series: prior to the beginning of Season 7, he gained  and was diagnosed with Type 2 diabetes, and when he finally returned to a healthy weight in the following season, he admitted he misses being fat, as he believed he had come across as "scary" to people. In Season 13, he is noticeably fit and physically stronger, though it is quickly revealed his motives for attaining his shape was strictly due to his intense desire for acceptance from the rest of the Gang. He often brags about his hand-to-hand combat skills, but typically flees from physical confrontation and is usually depicted as the most cowardly of the gang. Mac is a Roman Catholic, though he often espouses strong Christian fundamentalist opinions, despite his often amoral behavior, such as casual sex with numerous women, including Dennis's and Dee's mother. Though it is frequently insinuated Mac harbors homosexual feelings, he maintained an adamant denial of any such proclivity, much to the gang's annoyance, until he comes out in season 12. Later episodes reveal that Mac is sexually attracted to his best friend, Dennis.
 Kaitlin Olson as Deandra "Sweet Dee" Reynolds, waitress and sometimes bartender at Paddy's Pub, as well as Dennis's twin sister and Frank's daughter. Though initially depicted as The Gang's 'the voice of reason' in the debut season, she gradually loses any sense of moral fortitude that she once had, and is frequently shown to be just as prejudiced and depraved as her male friends by the end of season 1, arguably becoming the most petty member of the group, often plotting against others whom she deems more successful than herself in a vain effort to boost her own image. Dee wore a back brace in high school, leaving her with the nickname "The Aluminum Monster", and she is frequently referred to by the gang as a bird. Dee lives alone in an apartment. Though often the butt of the gang's jokes, she frequently involves herself in their schemes, perhaps due to her constant need for approval and attention from her peers. She does not hold any ownership stake in the bar - perhaps due to the gang's various prejudices against her, but also in part to her desire to become a professional actress/comedian (an ambition she consistently fails to achieve due to her debilitating stage fright and her general lack of any apparent talent). In multiple episodes, it is referenced that Dee set her college roommate on fire, and is often portrayed as the most physically violent of the group. Despite expressing outward disgust at her brother's more predatory behavior, later episodes reveal Dee not to be above such behavior herself.
 Danny DeVito as Frank Reynolds, father of Dennis and Dee Reynolds, and the majority owner of Paddy's Pub soon after his introduction in season 2 onward. Frank is a millionaire and often funds and enables The Gang's worst schemes and impulses, just to feel a sense of youthfulness and energy. He was once a successful businessman with a long history of illegal operations and dealings with sordid characters, but chooses to abandon that life and redeem himself after leaving his "whore wife", Barbara Reynolds. It is revealed at the end of season 2 that Dennis and Dee are products of an affair and not actually his biological children. He has since embraced his "feral" nature and describes himself as "fringe class". Despite his substantial financial resources, he chooses to share a decrepit studio apartment with Charlie, where they sleep together on a pullout couch and have a surprisingly affectionate pseudo-father/son relationship. The two have similar interests, such as playing the inexplicable game of Night Crawlers and foraging naked in sewers for valuables. He always arms himself with at least one loaded handgun and does not hesitate to brandish or even discharge one when provoked, and often snorts cocaine as part of his daily routine.

Production

Charlie Day, Glenn Howerton, and Rob McElhenney first met each other while auditioning for Tuck Everlasting and other projects in New York City and, later, in Los Angeles — they were going up for similar parts, moved to Los Angeles around the same time and even had the same manager Nick Frenkel. Day and Howerton, notably, got to know each other on a car ride back from testing for That '80s Show in late 2001, when Howerton was cast as Corey Howard and Day did not get the part of his best friend. While living in New York, Day had been making comedic home movies with Jimmi Simpson, Nate Mooney, David Hornsby and Logan Marshall-Green, his friends from the Williamstown Theatre Festival, many of whom would later go on to be involved with Sunny, which inspired McElhenney and Howerton to want to make short films of their own with him. McElhenney, in particular, had been writing screenplays between jobs and since none of them were picked up, decided to shoot them himself with Howerton, Day and other actor friends. The decision to make their own short films was further influenced by the release of the affordable Panasonic DVX100A digital camera as well as the accessible, low-budget look of The Office (UK) and Curb Your Enthusiasm.

It's Always Sunny in Philadelphia grew out of an idea for a short film conceived late one night by McElhenney "where a friend came over to another friend's house to get sugar, and the friend tells him he has cancer, and all the guy can think about is getting his sugar and getting out of there." He wrote the scene down before taking it to Howerton the next day to flesh it out and work on making it comedic. Day was soon roped in and the first script was written, featuring three struggling actors in LA named Charlie, Glenn and Mac, and the ensuing awkwardness around Charlie's cancer diagnosis. The home movies were shot and reshot multiple times, initially with Hornsby playing the Mac character and McElhenney behind the camera as director. It was via this process that McElhenney, Day and Howerton learnt the basics of shooting, editing and other aspects of film-making. The three then developed a second "episode" of their home movie series, this time focused on the cringe humor from Mac's sense of shame around his relationship with Carmen, a transgender woman. At this point, it became clear that the home movies had potential as a television series, instead of the short films they were envisioned as originally. Both parts would eventually end up in the episode "Charlie Has Cancer".

The home movie was titled It's Always Sunny on TV after the a-ha song "The Sun Always Shines on T.V.". Howerton had been listening to the album Hunting High and Low (1985) while stretching at a Crunch gym in West Hollywood.

This was then developed into a pilot called It's Always Sunny on TV and was shot on a digital camcorder and filmed in the actors' own apartments. They expanded the central cast to four people living in Los Angeles, "a group of best friends who care so little for each other", Howerton said.

It was believed the pilot was shot with a budget of just $200, but Day would later comment, "We shot it for nothing... I don't know where this $200 came from... We were a bunch of kids with cameras running around shooting each other and [the] next thing you know, we're eleven years in and we're still doing the show." This pilot was shopped by the actors around various studios, their pitch being simply showing the DVD of the pilot to executives. After viewing the pilot, FX Network ordered the first season. The show was budgeted at $450,000 an episode, less than a third of a network standard, using Panasonic's DVX100 MiniDV prosumer video camera. The original concept had "the gang" being out-of-work actors with the theme song being a cha-cha version of "Hooray for Hollywood"; however there were too many shows at the time with a similar premise. "The network came to us and said, 'We don't want a show about actors,' and we said, 'Fine, let's put it somewhere else,'" McElhenney explained. "I'm from Philly, let's put it in Philly, and we'll make it about a bar, because that's a job where you can have lots of free time and still have income that could explain how these people can sustain themselves." Prior to Kaitlin Olson joining the show, the character Sweet Dee was originally played by Jordan Reid, who at the time was the girlfriend of McElhenney, but was recast after they broke up. The title was later changed to reflect that, in the unaired pilot, the gang had been rewritten as bar owners in Philadelphia, instead of actors in LA.

After the first season, FX executives were worried about the show's low ratings and demanded that changes be made to the cast. "So, John Landgraf, who's the president of FX, he called me in for a meeting and was like, 'Hey, no one's watching the show, but we love it,'" McElhenney recalled. "'We wanna keep it on, but we don't have any money for marketing, and we need to add somebody with some panache that we can hopefully parlay into some public relations story, just so we can get people talking.'" FX began suggesting actors such as Danny DeVito that could boost the show's profile. "It's not that we were reticent to the idea of adding Danny to the show," Howerton recalled, "It's that we were reticent to add a name to the show. You know, because we kinda liked that we were no-names and it was this weird, small thing, you know." Initially, McElhenney refused, saying "No, I just don't think we wanna do that, and they were like, 'Oh OK, well, you know... the show's over.'" Realizing they needed to change the trajectory of the show to please the network, McElhenney, Howerton, and Day became open to adding a new cast member who was familiar to the public. However, McElhenney, Howerton, and Day were hesitant at first since they thought they would "ruin the show", particularly Day. DeVito later joined the cast in the first episode of the second season, playing the father of Dennis and Dee.

The show is shot in both Philadelphia and Los Angeles. The exterior of Paddy's Pub is located at the Starkman Building on 544 Mateo Street in Los Angeles.

On April 1, 2016, the series was renewed for a thirteenth and fourteenth season, which matched The Adventures of Ozzie and Harriet with the most seasons for a live-action sitcom in American television history. On April 9, 2020, McElhenney announced that writing had begun for the fifteenth season. Filming for the season began in May 2021 and wrapped that October. In January 2023, McElhenney confirmed that filming for the sixteenth season had begun.

Episodes

Broadcast and syndication
The first season ran for seven episodes with the finale airing September 15, 2005. According to McElhenney, word of mouth on the show was good enough for FX to renew it for a second season, which ran from June 29 to August 17, 2006. Reruns of edited first-season episodes began airing on FX's then-parent network, Fox, in June 2006, for a planned three-episode run—"The Gang Finds a Dead Guy," "Gun Fever" (which was renamed "Gun Control") and "Charlie Gets Molested" were shown. The show was not aired on broadcast television again until 2011, when FX began offering it for syndication.

The third season ran from September 13 to November 15, 2007. On March 5, 2008, FX renewed It's Always Sunny in Philadelphia for a fourth season. On July 15, 2008, it was reported that FX had ordered 39 additional episodes of the series, produced as seasons five through seven of the show. All five main cast members were secured for the entire scheduled run. The fifth season ran from September 17 to December 10, 2009. On May 31, 2010, Comedy Central began airing reruns. WGN America also began broadcasting the show as part of its fall 2011 schedule.

The sixth season ran from September 16 to December 9, 2010, comprising 12 episodes, plus the Christmas special. The seventh season ran from September 15 to December 15, 2011, comprising 13 episodes. On August 6, 2011, FX announced it had picked up the show for an additional two seasons (the eighth and ninth) running through 2013. On March 28, 2013, FX renewed the show for a tenth season, and announced that it would move to FX's new sister network, FXX.

In April 2017, Kaitlin Olson announced that It's Always Sunny in Philadelphia would go on an extended hiatus. In an interview with TV Guide, she said, "We ended up pushing our next season a year because we were all busy with separate projects this year. So at the end of this coming shooting season of The Mick, I'll step right into Sunny after that."

On October 2, 2017, the show premiered on Vice on TV.

The series is available for streaming on Hulu except for the episodes "America's Next Top Paddy's Billboard Model Contest", "Dee Reynolds: Shaping America's Youth", "The Gang Recycles Their Trash", "The Gang Makes Lethal Weapon 6" and "Dee Day", due to scenes involving blackface. The same episodes are missing from Netflix in the UK, Disney+ in Australia, Canada, and Scandinavia, and Star+ in Latin America.

Music

The show uses recurring orchestral production music selections. "We had a music supervisor called Ray Espinola and we said, 'Give us everything you have in a sort of Leave It to Beaver with a big band-swing kind of feel,' and the majority of the songs are from what he sent over," Charlie Day explained. "When you set it against what these characters were doing—which often times can be perceived as quite despicable, or wrong—it really disarmed the audience. It just became our go-to library of songs."

The theme song is called "Temptation Sensation" by German composer Heinz Kiessling. Kiessling's work ("On Your Bike" and "Blue Blood") can also be heard during various scene transitions throughout the show, along with other composers and pieces such as Werner Tautz ("Off Broadway"), Joe Brook ("Moonbeam Kiss"), and Karl Grell ("Honey Bunch"). Many of the tracks heard in the series are from Cafe Romantique, an album of easy listening production music collected by Extreme Music, the production music library unit of Sony/ATV Music Publishing. Independent record label Fervor Records has also contributed music to the show. Songs from The Jack Gray Orchestra's album Easy Listening Symph-O-Nette ("Take A Letter Miss Jones," "Golly Gee Whiz," and "Not a Care in the World") and the John Costello III release Giants of Jazz ("Birdcage," "Cotton Club" and "Quintessential") are heard in several episodes.

The soundtrack, featuring most of the music heard on the show, was released in 2010.

Soundtrack track listing

Reception and legacy

Critical reviews and commentary 
It's Always Sunny in Philadelphia has received critical acclaim for its humor and the performances of the cast. Emily Nussbaum of The New Yorker praised the show, calling it "not merely the best sitcom on television but one of the most arresting and ambitious current TV series, period." Gillian Flynn of Entertainment Weekly reviewed the first season negatively, commenting, "[I]t is smug enough to think it's breaking ground, but not smart enough to know it isn't." Brian Lowry of Variety gave the first season a positive review, saying it was "invariably clever and occasionally a laugh-out-loud riot, all while lampooning taboo topics." However, later seasons of the show have received favorable ratings on review aggregator Metacritic, receiving 70/100, 78/100 and 85/100 for seasons 4, 5 and 6 respectively. The show has become a cult hit with viewers and is often compared in style to Seinfeld—particularly due to the self-centered nature of its main characters. The Philadelphia Inquirer reviewer Jonathan Storm wrote, "It's like Seinfeld on crack," a quote that became widely used to describe the series, to the point that FX attached the tagline, "It's Seinfeld on crack."

In 2014, Entertainment Weekly listed the show at number 7 in the "26 Best Cult TV Shows Ever," with the comment that "it's a great underdog story ... If it sounds too dark for you, consider that there's an episode about making mittens for kittens, and it's adorable." In 2016, a New York Times study of the 50 TV shows with the most Facebook likes found that Sunny was "more popular in college towns (and most popular in Philadelphia)."

In 2015, Rolling Stone rated the top 20 greatest and funniest It's Always Sunny in Philadelphia episodes, stating "for 10 seasons, the series had mined comic gold from the execrable behavior of the owners of Paddy's Pub." They claimed the two-part season 4 episode, "Mac and Charlie Die" is the sitcom's greatest episode yet. In 2019, the BBC called the show "the best US sitcom." They praised the show's unique outlook and ability to range from nihilistic humor to genuine heartfelt moments.

According to Matt Fowler of IGN, the series "broke new ground" due to its sociopathic depiction of "The Gang". It was also ranked 63rd in IGN's list of the top 100 TV shows of all time.

Awards

Other media

The Nightman Cometh live
In September 2009, the cast took their show live. The "Gang" performed the musical The Nightman Cometh in New York City, Boston, Seattle, San Francisco, Los Angeles, and Philadelphia. Mary Elizabeth Ellis and Artemis Pebdani also appeared in the performance as The Waitress and Artemis. Actress Rhea Perlman (wife of Danny DeVito) assumed the role of Gladys.

Creator Rob McElhenney said that Live Nation originally approached the cast about doing the show at 30 cities, but in the end the cast settled on 6. Co-developer Glenn Howerton described the show as "essentially an expanded version of the actual episode of "The Nightman Cometh," which was the final episode for season four. There are some added moments, added scenes, added songs, and extended versions of songs that already existed." The performance featured two new songs, and the actors were given more opportunity to improvise thanks to the longer running time. An episode from season five was also previewed before the show.

The Los Angeles performance, filmed at The Troubadour, was included as a bonus feature on the season four DVD box set.

Russian adaptation
A Russian adaptation of It's Always Sunny in Philadelphia premiered in Russia on the television channel TNT on May 12, 2014. This version is titled В Москве всегда солнечно (V Moskve vsegda solnechno, It's Always Sunny in Moscow) and like the original, centers around four friends, who own a bar called "Philadelphia" in Moscow.

Book
A book based upon It's Always Sunny in Philadelphia was released on January 6, 2015, titled The Gang Writes a Self-Help Book: The 7 Secrets of Awakening the Highly Effective Four-Hour Giant, Today.

Podcast 
On November 9, 2021, Howerton, Day, and McElhenney started The Always Sunny Podcast, an episode-by-episode-recap of the show, with Megan Ganz as producer. Occasional guest stars include Kaitlin Olson, David Hornsby, Mary Elizabeth Ellis, Michael Naughton, Lin-Manuel Miranda, Cormac Bluestone and Danny DeVito.

References

External links

 
 

 
2000s American black comedy television series
2000s American satirical television series
2000s American single-camera sitcoms
2000s American workplace comedy television series
2005 American television series debuts
2010s American black comedy television series
2010s American LGBT-related comedy television series
2010s American satirical television series
2010s American single-camera sitcoms
2010s American workplace comedy television series
2020s American black comedy television series
2020s American satirical television series
2020s American single-camera sitcoms
2020s American workplace comedy television series
Alcohol abuse in television
American LGBT-related sitcoms
Culture of Philadelphia
English-language television shows
FX Networks original programming
FXX original programming
Irish-American culture in Philadelphia
Narcissism in television
Television series about dysfunctional families
Television series about twins
Television series by 3 Arts Entertainment
Television series by 20th Century Fox Television
Television shows set in Philadelphia